eklektikos is a classical chamber music ensemble specializing in the performance of music by contemporary Canadian composers. Based in Charlottetown, Prince Edward Island, Canada, its core members include Dale Sorensen (trombone and artistic director), Morgan Saulnier (flute), Karem Simon (clarinet), and Richard Covey (piano).

History 
The contemporary classical chamber music ensemble eklektikos was founded in 2002 by PEI trombonist Dale Sorensen, the group's current artistic director. That same year the ensemble recorded the score for Picking Lucy's Brain, a film written and directed by Jason Rogerson, with original music composed by Barrie Sorensen. The group was also featured at the 2002 Canadian Acoustical Association's national conference, which was held in Charlottetown.

As part of its commitment to the performance of Canadian music, eklektikos has been invited several times to participate in the Canadian Music Centre's New Music in New Places project. Funded by SOCAN and the Government of Canada through their Canada Music Fund, this program was created to disseminate the music of Canadian composers to a wider public by presenting performances in non-traditional venues. Some of eklektikos' performances were held at the Charlottetown Mall (April 2005), the Charlottetown Farmers Market (2008), the Charlottetown Toyota car dealership (November 2009), and the Charlottetown Airport (March 2011).

Several new compositions have been created through grants that eklektikos has received from the PEI Council of the Arts. One of these projects resulted in the creation of new works by eight PEI composers, all of which were premiered by eklektikos in March 2005. Another project, in July 2007, facilitated the creation of new works by four young Atlantic Canadian composers who were mentored by Jim O'Leary during a 4-day workshop which culminated in a public performance of all the new works.

eklektikos regularly performs on the recital series at the UPEI Music Department, where all of the ensemble members serve on faculty.

Premieres 
eklektikos has given the world premiere performances of the following 23 compositions, most of which were written by Canadian composers, including 16 works by Prince Edward Island composers.
 W.L. Altman: Inside C (flute, alto saxophone, trumpet, trombone, vibraphone, piano) - 2002
 Jennifer Barrett-Drew: Two Trees in Eden (flute, trombone, cello, guitar, piano) - 2005
 Jean Chatillon: Le son du verre (alto saxophone, trombone) - 2007
Monica Clorey: Five Waltzes (or The Epicurean Anthem) (flute, clarinet, trumpet, trombone, piano) - 2007
 James Grant Code: Scherzo Eclectique (trumpet, trombone, piano) - 2002
 Richard Covey: Discord (flute) - 2005
 Richard Covey: Improvvisando (trombone, piano) - 2010
 Richard Covey: Sounds on the Waves (flute, clarinet, trumpet, trombone, piano) - 2007
 Richard Covey: Te Deum (flute, clarinet, piano) - 2010
 Jim Dickson: Blues for Henry (alto saxophone, trombone, banjo, snare drum) - 2009
 Jim Dickson: Odd One Out (flute, trumpet, trombone, piano, percussion) - 2005
 Matt Doran: Quartet (flute, marimba, trombone, piano) - 2006
 Anthony Genge: Shadows and Glass (trombone, piano) - 2004
 Matthew Lane: The Weaving Together (flute, clarinet, trumpet, trombone, piano, CD) - 2007
 Jane Naylor: To Another Time (flute, trombone) - 2005
 Jim O'Leary: Two Landscapes (soprano, flute, clarinet, trumpet, trombone, piano) - 2007
 Jim O'Leary: Fläskfilé (soprano, clarinet, trumpet, trombone) - 2007
 Gerry Rutten: PEI Suite (flute, trumpet, trombone, piano, percussion) - 2005
 Karri Shea: Enniskillen (flute, clarinet, trumpet, trombone) - 2007
 Dale Sorensen: Eine Kleine Naught Musik (flute, tenor saxophone, trumpet, trombone, marimba, piano) - 2005
 Bert Tersteeg: Bachanalis (flute, trumpet, trombone, vibraphone, piano) - 2005
 Bert Tersteeg: Western Skies (from 4 Canadian Scenes) (flute, trumpet, trombone, piano) - 2006
 Seth von Handorf: Cartoon Circus Spy (flute, alto saxophone, trumpet, trombone, vibraphone, piano) - 2005

References

External links 
eklektikos official website

Canadian classical music groups
Chamber music groups
Musical groups established in 2002
2002 establishments in Prince Edward Island
Musical groups from Charlottetown